Chevremont may refer to:

Chevremont, a community in the municipality of Kerkrade in the Netherlands,
Chèvremont, a commune in the region of Bourgogne-Franche-Comté in France,
Chevremont-le-Myrr, the original Anglo-Norman name and etymological root of the village of Kirmond le Mire in Lincolnshire, England,
a French surname.

See also Guevremont.